Peca Castle() is a castle near the city of Kukës, in northeastern Albania. It sits on a Peninsula on Fierza Reservoir. The castle is believed to have been built in the 6th century BC. There is a church inside the castle built by Justinian.

See also
Kukës
List of castles in Albania
Tourism in Albania
History of Albania

References

External links

Castles in Albania
Kukës